Moses Zeh Blah (18 April 1947 – 1 April 2013) was a Liberian politician. He served as the 28th vice president of Liberia under President Charles Taylor and became the 23rd president of Liberia on 11 August 2003, following Taylor's resignation. He served as president for two months, until 14 October 2003, when a United Nations-backed transitional government, headed by Gyude Bryant, was established and Bryant was sworn in as Chairman of the Transitional Government of Liberia.

Career
Blah was born in Toweh Town, Liberia, a Gio-speaking hamlet in north-eastern Nimba County, close to the border with the Ivory Coast. He joined with Taylor because of a shared hatred of President Samuel Doe, who had killed Blah's wife along with hundreds of others in an ethnic-related massacre.  He trained with Taylor in a Libyan guerrilla camp and served with him as a general during Liberia's civil war in the 1990s.  He held the post of ambassador to Libya and Tunisia after Taylor was elected in 1997. In July 2000 Blah was appointed as Vice President after the death of Enoch Dogolea who was rumoured to have been poisoned.

Blah was known as a quiet and unassuming man, driving his own jeep around town rather than using a motorcade and driver, and wearing flowing African robes instead of the normal olive green military uniform. He was constantly annoyed by the presence of bodyguards following him around.

In June 2003, Taylor had left the country for peace talks in Ghana, and while there he was indicted by the war crimes tribunal in Sierra Leone. Blah was urged by the United States to take power from Taylor during his absence, but Blah made no such attempt. After Taylor's return, Blah was held under house arrest for ten days, but was subsequently absolved and reinstated as Vice President.

When Taylor resigned in August of that year, Blah briefly succeeded him as president. He was condemned by Liberian rebel groups for his close ties to Taylor; they charged that he would simply continue Taylor's practices.  Blah responded by calling the rebels "brothers" and saying "Let bygones be bygones.  If there is power, we can share it." He invited the rebels to negotiate in his own house.

On 7 April 2008, Blah said that he had been sent a subpoena to testify at Taylor's trial before the Special Court for Sierra Leone in The Hague. He said that he would testify and "speak the truth", and he testified on 14 May 2008, describing child soldiers and the relationship between Taylor and Foday Sankoh. On February 1, 2009, Blah was accused of taking part in the murder of RUF commander Sam Bockarie, by a  witness narrative to the commissioners of Liberia’s Truth and Reconciliation Commission (TRC). 
The witness, a senior commander of the defunct Anti-Terrorist Unit (ATU) of exiled President Charles Taylor, claimed Vice president Blah was part of the conspiracy and participated in the killing of Bockarie in the town of Tiaplay in Nimba County. 

Blah died early on 1 April 2013, two weeks and three days before his 66th birthday, at the John F. Kennedy Hospital in Monrovia.

Personal life
Originally trained as a mechanic, Blah was fluent in German, French and Arabic.

References

External links
BBC News: Moses Blah Profile
Moses Blah Conspiracy
Moses Blah Background, Emily Robinson, Lehrer NewsHour Online Backgrounder

Presidents of Liberia
Vice presidents of Liberia
1947 births
2013 deaths
People from Nimba County
National Patriotic Party politicians
Ambassadors of Liberia to Libya
Ambassadors of Liberia to Tunisia
Dan people
20th-century Liberian politicians
21st-century Liberian politicians